This is a list of museums in the Central African Republic.

List 

 Musée Barthélémy Boganda
 Musée de Bouar

See also 
 List of museums

External links 
 Museums in the Central African Republic

 
Central African Republic
Museums
Museums
Museums
Central African Republic